Bowleaze Cove is a small sand and shingle beach, near the village of Preston, just to the northeast of Weymouth, Dorset, England. The cove is on the Jurassic Coast and is known for its geology.  Just to the west is Furzy Cliff.

The beach is made up of mainly shingle and shell with some sandy areas. A small pier divides the beach near the River Jordan outflow.
The remains of Jordan Hill Roman Temple are located on Jordan Hill, leading down to Bowleaze. The hill figure of the Osmington White Horse can be seen.

A coastal cliff walk leads eastwards from Bowleaze, passing the Broadrock cliffs, Redcliff Point, and thence to Osmington Mills.

In culture
In 1816–17, the artist John Constable painted Weymouth Bay: Bowleaze Cove and Jordon Hill while on his honeymoon. The painting is now in the National Gallery, London.

Commerce
The Riviera Hotel, a Grade II listed Spanish-style 1930s building is on the cove.

The Fantasy Island Funfair is there.

References

External links
Pictures of Bowleaze

Beaches of Dorset
Geography of Weymouth, Dorset
Coves of Dorset
Jurassic Coast